Imyanlikulevo (İmänlequl) is a rural locality (a selo) in Chekmagushevsky District, Bashkortostan, Russia. The population was 761 as of 2010. There are 15 streets.

Geography 
Imyanlikulevo is located 20 km north of Chekmagush (the district's administrative centre) by road. Zemeyevo is the nearest rural locality.

References 

Rural localities in Chekmagushevsky District